The 1991 Wimbledon Championships was a tennis tournament played on grass courts at the All England Lawn Tennis and Croquet Club in Wimbledon, London in the United Kingdom. It was the 105th edition of the Wimbledon Championships and were held from 24 June to 7 July 1991.

Due to heavy rain during the first week of the Championships, play was held on the "Middle Sunday", in this case June 30, for the first time in the tournament's history.

Prize money
The total prize money for 1991 championships was £4,010,970. The winner of the men's title earned £240,000 while the women's singles champion earned £216,000.

* per team

Champions

Seniors

Men's singles

 Michael Stich defeated  Boris Becker, 6–4, 7–6(7–4), 6–4
 It was Stich's 1st career Grand Slam title and his 1st Wimbledon title.

Women's singles

 Steffi Graf defeated  Gabriela Sabatini, 6–4, 3–6, 8–6
 It was Graf's 11th career Grand Slam title and her 3rd Wimbledon title.

Men's doubles

 John Fitzgerald /  Anders Järryd defeated  Javier Frana /  Leonardo Lavalle, 6–3, 6–4, 6–7(7–9), 6–1
 It was Fitzgerald's 7th career Grand Slam title and his 2nd Wimbledon title. It was Järryd's 7th career Grand Slam title and his 2nd and last Wimbledon title.

Women's doubles

 Larisa Savchenko /  Natasha Zvereva defeated  Gigi Fernández /  Jana Novotná 6–4, 3–6, 8–6
 It was Savchenko's 2nd career Grand Slam title and her 1st Wimbledon title. It was Zvereva's 3rd career Grand Slam title and her 1st Wimbledon title.

Mixed doubles

 John Fitzgerald /  Elizabeth Smylie defeated  Jim Pugh /  Natasha Zvereva, 7–6(7–4), 6–2
 It was Smylie's 4th and last career Grand Slam title and her 2nd Wimbledon title. It was Fitzgerald's 8th career Grand Slam title and his 3rd and last Wimbledon title.

Juniors

Boys' singles

 Thomas Enqvist defeated  Michael Joyce, 6–4, 6–3

Girls' singles

 Barbara Rittner defeated  Elena Makarova, 6–7(6–8), 6–2, 6–3

Boys' doubles

 Karim Alami /  Greg Rusedski defeated  John-Laffnie de Jager /  Andriy Medvedev, 1–6, 7–6(7–4), 6–4

Girls' doubles

 Catherine Barclay /  Limor Zaltz defeated  Joanne Limmer /  Angie Woolcock, 6–4, 6–4

Singles seeds

Men's singles
  Stefan Edberg (semifinals, lost to Michael Stich)
  Boris Becker (final, lost to Michael Stich)
  Ivan Lendl (third round, lost to David Wheaton)
  Jim Courier (quarterfinals, lost to Michael Stich)
  Andre Agassi (quarterfinals, lost to David Wheaton)
  Michael Stich (champion)
  Guy Forget (quarterfinals, lost to Boris Becker)
  Pete Sampras (second round, lost to Derrick Rostagno)
  Michael Chang (first round, lost to Tim Mayotte)
  Goran Ivanišević (second round, lost to Nick Brown)
  Emilio Sánchez (first round, lost to Patrick McEnroe)
  Andrei Cherkasov (first round, lost to Richey Reneberg)
  Jakob Hlasek (second round, lost to Todd Woodbridge)
  Karel Nováček (fourth round, lost to Jim Courier)
  Brad Gilbert (third round, lost to Christian Bergström)
  John McEnroe (fourth round, lost to Stefan Edberg)

Women's singles
  Steffi Graf (champion)
  Gabriela Sabatini (final, lost to Steffi Graf)
  Martina Navratilova (quarterfinals, lost to Jennifer Capriati)
  Arantxa Sánchez Vicario (quarterfinals, lost to Mary Joe Fernández)
  Mary Joe Fernández (semifinals, lost to Steffi Graf)
  Jana Novotná (second round, lost to Brenda Schultz)
  Zina Garrison (quarterfinals, lost to Steffi Graf)
  Katerina Maleeva (fourth round, lost to Laura Gildemeister)
  Jennifer Capriati (semifinals, lost to Gabriela Sabatini)
  Helena Suková (first round, lost to Gigi Fernández)
  Nathalie Tauziat (fourth round, lost to Gabriela Sabatini)
  Natasha Zvereva (second round, lost to Linda Harvey-Wild)
  Anke Huber (fourth round, lost to Zina Garrison)
  Amy Frazier (fourth round, lost to Steffi Graf)
  Sandra Cecchini (first round, lost to Elizabeth Smylie)
  Judith Wiesner (fourth round, lost to Mary Joe Fernández)

References

External links
 Official Wimbledon Championships website

 
Wimbledon Championships
Wimbledon Championships
June 1991 sports events in the United Kingdom
July 1991 sports events in the United Kingdom